Angelica Creek is a  tributary of the Schuylkill River in Berks County, Pennsylvania in the United States.

Angelica Creek joins the Schuylkill River at Kenhorst.

See also
List of rivers of Pennsylvania

References

External links
U.S. Geological Survey: PA stream gaging stations

Rivers of Berks County, Pennsylvania
Rivers of Pennsylvania
Tributaries of the Schuylkill River